David Květoň (born 3 January 1988) is a Czech professional ice hockey forward who is currently playing with HC Košice in the Tipsport liga (Slovak).

Kveton played previously for VHK Vsetín, HC Oceláři Třinec, Oulun Kärpät, BK Mladá Boleslav, Piráti Chomutov and HC Vítkovice Ridera. He was selected by the New York Rangers in the 4th round (104 overall) of the 2006 NHL Entry Draft but did not play.

References

External links

1988 births
Living people
Czech ice hockey forwards
Gatineau Olympiques players
HC Košice players
Oulun Kärpät players
HC Oceláři Třinec players
New York Rangers draft picks
Sportspeople from Nový Jičín
BK Mladá Boleslav players
Piráti Chomutov players
HC Vítkovice players
VHK Vsetín players
Czech expatriate ice hockey players in Canada
Czech expatriate ice hockey players in Finland
Czech expatriate ice hockey players in Slovakia